Denis Pineda (born August 10, 1995) is a Salvadoran professional footballer who plays as a midfielder for Primera División club Águila and the El Salvador national team.

Club career
On 27 June 2016, it was announced that Pineda would sign to a one-year loan to Portuguese second division club Santa Clara. On 30 July 2016, Pineda made his debut with Santa Clara in a 2016–17 Taça da Liga match against Portimonense S.C. He scored his first goal against Académica de Coimbra on 14 August 2016.

International goals
Scores and results list El Salvador's goal tally first.

References

External links

1995 births
Living people
Salvadoran footballers
Salvadoran expatriate footballers
El Salvador international footballers
Primeira Liga players
Liga Portugal 2 players
Ecuadorian Serie A players
Tigres UANL footballers
C.D. Santa Clara players
G.D. Estoril Praia players
C.D. Técnico Universitario footballers
2017 CONCACAF Gold Cup players
Salvadoran expatriate sportspeople in Mexico
Salvadoran expatriate sportspeople in Portugal
Expatriate footballers in Mexico
Expatriate footballers in Portugal
Expatriate footballers in Ecuador
Association football midfielders